Julie Goskowicz Koons (born March 2, 1980) is a retired American short track speed skater and a two-time Winter Olympian. She competed as part of the United States speed skating team in the 3000 meter relay in both the 1998 Winter Olympics in Nagano and the 2002 Winter Olympics in Salt Lake City. Julie's brother is also a former U.S. Olympian.

References

1980 births
Living people
American female speed skaters
American female short track speed skaters
Olympic short track speed skaters of the United States
Short track speed skaters at the 2002 Winter Olympics
Sportspeople from Cleveland
People from New Berlin, Wisconsin
Sportspeople from the Milwaukee metropolitan area
21st-century American women